The 2016 World Ringette Championships (2016 WRC) was an international ringette tournament and the 11th (XI) World Ringette Championships. The tournament was organized by the International Ringette Federation (IRF) and was contested in Helsinki, Finland between December 27, 2015, and January 3, 2016. The main competition took place at the Helsinki Ice Hall. It was the first time the Team Slovakia and the Team Czech appeared at the international tournament. This was also the first year Sweden formed the Sweden national junior ringette team (U19).

In addition to the main competition, a tournament known as the "Ringette Festival" was held for U14 teams.

Overview
Participating national teams in the included: Team Canada Senior and  Team Canada Junior (U19), Team Finland Senior and Team Finland Junior (U19), Team Sweden Senior and Team Sweden Junior (U19), Team USA Senior, Team Czech Republic Senior, and Team Slovakia Senior.
Team Canada Juniors won the gold medal in the under 21 category.

Eighteen of the games were live-streamed online and made available for public viewing.

Venue

Teams

Final standings

Senior Pool results
The Senior Pool competition, also known as the "Sam Jacks Series", was a three-game series between Team Canada Senior and Team Finland Senior. Team Finland Senior won the gold medal and the Sam Jacks Trophy.

Junior Pool results

Rosters

Seniors

Team Finland Senior
The 2016 Team Finland Senior team included the following:

Team Canada Senior
Team Canada Senior team competed in the 2016 World Ringette Championships. The 2016 Team Canada Senior team included the following:

Team Sweden Senior
The 2016 Sweden Senior team included the following:

Team USA Senior
The 2016 USA Senior team included the following:

Team Czech Republic Senior
The 2016 Czech Republic Senior team included the following:

Juniors

Team Finland Junior
The 2016 Team Finland Junior team included the following:

Team Canada Junior

The 2016 Team Canada Junior team included the following:

Team Sweden Junior
This was the first time Sweden sent a junior national ringette team to the World Ringette Championships. The 2016 Sweden Junior team included the following:

See also
 World Ringette Championships
 International Ringette Federation
  Canada national ringette team
  Finland national ringette team
  Sweden national ringette team
  United States national ringette team
  Czech Republic national ringette team
  Slovakia national ringette team

References

Ringette
Ringette competitions
World Ringette Championships
World Ringette Championships
International sports competitions hosted by Finland
International sports competitions in Helsinki
2010s in Helsinki
World Ringette Championships
World Ringette Championships